The "Republican Revolution", "Revolution of '94", or "Gingrich Revolution" are political slogans that refer to the Republican Party (GOP) success in the 1994 U.S. mid-term elections, which resulted in a net gain of 54 seats in the House of Representatives, and a pick-up of eight seats in the Senate. On November 9, 1994, the day after the election, Senator Richard Shelby of Alabama, a conservative Democrat, changed parties, becoming a Republican; on March 3, 1995, Colorado Senator Ben Nighthorse Campbell switched to the Republican side as well, increasing the GOP Senate majority.

Rather than campaigning independently in each district, Republican candidates chose to rally behind a single national program and message fronted by Georgia congressman and House Republican whip Newt Gingrich. They alleged that President Bill Clinton was not the "New Democrat" he claimed to be during his 1992 campaign, but was a "tax and spend" liberal. The Republicans offered an alternative to Clinton's policies in the form of the Contract with America.

The gains in seats in the mid-term election resulted in the Republicans gaining control of both the House and the Senate in January 1995. Republicans had not held the majority in the House for 40 years, since the 83rd Congress (elected in 1952). From 1933 to 1995, Republicans had controlled both House and Senate for only four years. From 1933 into the early 1970s, most white conservatives in the South belonged to the Democratic Party, and created the Solid South bloc in Congress. Most African Americans in the South were disenfranchised in those years, based on laws and subjective administration of voter registration practices.

By the mid-1990s, white conservatives from the South joined Republicans in other parts of the country, leading to the change in Congress. Large Republican gains were made in state houses as well when the GOP picked up twelve gubernatorial seats and 472 legislative seats. In so doing, it took control of 20 state legislatures from the Democrats. Prior to this, Republicans had not held the majority of governorships since 1972. In addition, this was the first time in 50 years that the GOP controlled a majority of state legislatures.

Discontent with Democratic candidates was foreshadowed by a string of elections after 1992, including Republicans winning the mayoralties of New York and Los Angeles in 1993. In that same year, Christine Todd Whitman won the New Jersey governorship. Bret Schundler became the first Republican mayor of Jersey City, New Jersey, which had been held by the Democratic Party since 1917.

Republican George Allen won the 1993 Virginia gubernatorial election, and Texas Republican Kay Bailey Hutchison won a U.S. Senate seat from the Democrats in the 1993 special election. Republicans also picked up three congressional seats from Democrats in Oklahoma and Kentucky in May 1994.

Ramifications 
When the 104th United States Congress convened in January 1995, House Republicans voted former Minority Whip Newt Gingrich—the chief author of the Contract with America—to become Speaker of the House. The new senatorial Republican majority chose Bob Dole, previously Minority Leader, as Majority Leader. Republicans pursued an ambitious agenda, but were often forced to compromise with Democratic president Bill Clinton, who wielded veto power.

The 1994 election also marked the end of the conservative coalition, a bi-partisan coalition of conservative Republicans and Democrats (often referred to as "boll weevil Democrats", for their association with the South). This white conservative coalition had often managed to control Congressional outcomes since the New Deal era.

Pick-ups 
Numerous Republican freshmen entered Congress. Of the 230 Republican House members of the 104th Congress, almost a third were new to the House. In the Senate, 11 of 54 (20%) Republicans were freshmen.

Senate

House of Representatives

Governorships

See also 
 1998 United States elections
 2000 United States elections
 2002 United States elections
 2004 United States elections
 2010 United States elections
 2014 United States elections
 2016 United States elections
 2018 United States elections

References

External links 
 Booknotes interview with Dan Balz on Storming the Gates: Protest Politics and the Republican Revival, February 18, 1996

1994 in American politics
Newt Gingrich
Political history of the United States
Politics of the Southern United States
Republican Party (United States)
Conservatism in the United States